The Cambodian passport is issued to citizens of Cambodia for international travel.

Since 17 July 2014, the Cambodian government introduced the new biometric passport, which is now valid for 10 years.

Fees
The application fee for a Cambodian passport is the highest among all Asian countries and one of the highest in the world. Since the launch of the new biometric passport in 2014, the application fee has been lowered to US$100 for a 10-year passport, and $80 for a 5-year passport (only issued to children aged 5 and below).

Previously, the machine readable passport cost $135 with a validity of only three years (extendable twice for every two years), and the processing time ranged from 55 days to more than two months. In comparison, a Vietnamese passport with 10-year validity costs only $15 and the processing time is only two weeks. The current processing fee for the 10-year passport, however, has decreased 65 percent compared to the old machine-readable passport.

Required documents
Processing a Cambodian passport requires the applicant to produce 2 other documents as a proof of citizenship as well as residency.

Below are the 2 requirements:
 Valid Cambodian identity card.
 Proof of residency (any one of below):  a. Family Record Book, or  b. Resident Book, or  c. Proof of residency letter.
As a side note, the proof of residency letter can be produced by district officers around the applicant's area as long as they are able to provide enough evidence of their residency.

Appearance 
The Cambodian government began issuing new biometric passports in 2014. The design of the passports has received some changes. The passport has a brown cover with the coat of arms of Cambodia on the front. Above the coat of arms is the inscription "KINGDOM OF CAMBODIA" in Khmer, English and French. Below the coat of arms is the inscription "PASSPORT" in three languages.

The passport is printed in three languages: Khmer, English and French.

Identification page 

 Picture of the passport holder (Width: 40mm, Height: 60mm; Head height (up to the top of the hair): 36mm; Distance from the top of the photo to the top of the hair: 6mm; White background)
 Type ("P" for passport)
 Country code
 Passport serial number
 Last name and first name of the passport holder
 Citizenship
 Date of birth (DD. MM. YYYY)
 Gender (M for men or F for women)
 Birthplace
 Date of issue (DD. MM. YYYY)
 Passport holder's signature
 Expiration date (DD. MM. YYYY)

Visa requirements

On 28 September 2019, Cambodian citizens had visa-free or visa on arrival access to 53 countries and territories, ranking the Cambodian passport 88th in the world according to the Visa Restrictions Index.

See also
 Visa requirements for Cambodian citizens
 List of passports

References

Passports by country
Government of Cambodia